Justice Hamilton may refer to:

Andrew Jackson Hamilton (1815–1875), associate justice of the Texas Supreme Court
John Hamilton (judge) (fl. 1960s–2000s), judge of the Supreme Court of New South Wales, 1997–2009
Orris L. Hamilton (1914–1994), associate justice of the Washington Supreme Court
Robert W. Hamilton (judge) (1899–1981), associate justice of the Texas Supreme Court
Liam Hamilton (1928–2000), former chief justice of Ireland, former justice of the Supreme Court of Ireland, and former President of the High Court
Wilson H. Hamilton (1877–1949), associate justice of the Iowa Supreme Court

See also
Judge Hamilton (disambiguation)